Mike or Michael Baldwin may refer to:
 Mike Baldwin (Coronation Street), a fictional character in the British soap opera
 Mike Baldwin (motorcyclist) (born 1955), American motorcycle road racer
A. Michael Baldwin (born 1963), American actor, producer and screenwriter
Michael Baldwin, fictional character in The Young and the Restless
 Michael Baldwin (designer) (?–2014), British designer
 Michael Baldwin (artist) (born 1945), British conceptual artist, member and co-founder of Art & Language